Lazaros Kalemis (born November 15, 1972) is a first-generation Greek-American businessman and payments, industry veteran. He is known as the founder and chief executive officer of Simpay (United States), a payment processing and merchant business solutions company based in Huntingdon Valley, Pennsylvania. It was formerly known as Alpha Card Services. In May 2012, Lazaros received a Philadelphia 40 under 40 award. July 11, 2012, the company announced that Kalemis was a finalist for the SmartCEO Circle of Excellence award under the Distinguished Leadership category. In 2012, Kalemis was named a finalist for the Ernst & Young Entrepreneur of the Year Award.

Kalemis was one of five Philadelphia region CEO's inducted into the Philadelphia 100: 2011 CEO Hall of Fame, which honors the fastest-growing companies in the Philadelphia region, as well as the youngest member inducted in the organization's history. Alpha Card Services was also inducted into the Philadelphia 100: 2011 Company Hall of Fame. Both honors were bestowed to the company due to the five consecutive years of Alpha Card Services receiving the Philadelphia 100 ranking.

A two-time cancer survivor, Kalemis was diagnosed with Non-Hodgkin's Lymphoma in 1998 and with Chronic Myloed Leukemia in 2005.

Early years
Born in 1972, in the Frankford section of Philadelphia, Pennsylvania, Kalemis is the son of Greek immigrants who arrived in the United States in 1970.  At an early age, Kalemis worked for the family business, a Philadelphia pizzeria called Original Boston Style Pizza.

Kalemis started his first business, Kaleo Publications, at the age of 19 while pursuing a marketing degree from La Salle University. Kaleo Publications was a global business directory publisher, with Kalemis eventually employing 135 employees in 3 offices in Pennsylvania, Arizona, and California. Kalemis sold Kaleo Publications to a partner in 1998 when he was diagnosed with Non-Hodgkin's Lymphoma at age 24.

In 1997, Kalemis graduated from La Salle University with a degree in Marketing.

In 1999, Kalemis opened a second pizzeria location with his parents, called New Boston Style Pizza in the Rhawnhurst section of Philadelphia.

According to reports, the idea to start Alpha Card Services was inspired by a layover Kalemis had at Rome's Fiumicino airport in 2000.  Kalemis read a Philadelphia Inquirer article about how the use of credit cards had grown by a yearly average of 15% since 1972, regardless of how the economy fared.   Kalemis shared the article with his longtime friend, Dimitrios Tsikoudis. The two friends saw the yearly credit card processing growth as a new business opportunity, and in October 2000 Dimitrios Tsikoudis and Lazaros Kalemis Co-founded Alpha Card Services.

Alpha Card Services
Under Kalemis, Alpha Card Services has become the 60th largest merchant acquirer in the United States and the 143rd largest acquirer in the world as ranked by the Nilson Report. Alpha Card Services provides merchant services and ancillary services, such as Payroll, Point-of-Sale Systems, Gift and Reward Cards, ATM Services and Merchant cash advance to over 15,000 U.S. locations and processes in excess of $2 billion in credit card volume annually.

Alpha Card Services was named one of the fastest growing private companies in the United States for seven consecutive years (2007, 2008, 2009, 2010, 2011, 2012, 2013, by Inc. Magazine 500 | 5000 list and was ranked by Philadelphia Business Journal’s Top 100 consecutively since 2007 (2007, 2008, 2009, 2010, 2011.)

In addition to owning and operating Alpha Card Services, Kalemis controls Pinnacle Merchant Advance, Alpha POS Services and Alpha Payroll Services, divisions of Alpha Card Services. Pinnacle Merchant Advance focuses on merchant cash advances, Alpha POS Services provides point-of-sale (POS) systems to merchants in the hospitality, retail, salon, and supermarket industries, and Alpha Payroll Services provides  Payroll Services to small and medium size businesses.

Lazaros was interviewed by Crissa Shoemaker DeBree staff writer for Calkins Media which owns 8 newspapers and 3 television stations. The Feature article Success through Service details his upbringing, the business history, growth, and philosophy, and future plans.

On March 17, 2013, Alpha Card Services has named a Philly.com Top Workplaces company.

On October 17, 2013, CEO Lazaros Kalemis was named the winner of the SmartCEO Circle of Excellence award under the Professional Services category.

Philanthropy
Kalemis has formed a charitable initiative called Alpha Card Cares. According to the company, the purpose of the Alpha Card Cares initiative is "to mobilize the collective financial and organizational efforts of Alpha Card employees, management, customers and vendors, to support a variety of causes and organizations."

Lazaros and Alpha Card Cares have been involved in a number charity and volunteer events, including the Kids & Hope Foundation, Susan G. Komen 3-Day for the Cure, Big Brothers Big Sisters of Bucks County, The Leukemia & Lymphoma Society's Light The Night Walk and the Walk to Defeat ALS, Greater Philadelphia Chapter.

See also
List of Greek Americans

References

External links
Official Alpha Card Services website

1972 births
Living people
Businesspeople from Philadelphia
American people of Greek descent